Jerry Zucker (August 24, 1949 – April 12, 2008) was an Israeli-born American businessman, investor, and philanthropist.

Career
Zucker was president and CEO of the InterTech Group. He was President and CEO of the Polymer Group at the time it acquired the Montreal-based Dominion Textile Company in 1997; he resigned from Polymer Group in 2003. In 2006, he acquired the Hudson's Bay Company of Canada, North America's oldest company (established by English royal charter in 1670), becoming its Governor (Company Chairman) and CEO. Zucker was also a part-owner of the South Carolina Stingrays of the ECHL. He ranked #354 on Forbes 400 Richest Americans and #746 on Forbes Billionaire List 2006. In 2008, Forbes placed his wealth at $1.2 billion USD. He held over 350 patents in his lifetime and donated millions of dollars to international medical missions as well as local charities.

Personal life
Jerry Zucker was born 24 August 1949 in Tel Aviv, Israel, one of three children born to Leon Zucker and Zipora Zucker (née Shlifkovitz), the other two being his brother Jacob and his sister Rochelle. His parents were both Holocaust survivors. Zucker immigrated to the United States through Ellis Island in 1952. As a child, he lived in South Carolina, Florida, and New Jersey, where he attended Jewish day schools his parents helped found. As a young man, Zucker attended the University of Florida, majoring in Chemistry, Mathematics, and Physics. He later earned an M.S. in Electrical Engineering.

Zucker passed away from a brain tumor on 12 April 2008. Zucker was survived by his wife Anita, and by his children Jonathan Zucker, Andrea Muzin, and Jeffrey Zucker.

At the time of his death, Zucker had been married to Anita Goldberg, his high school sweetheart, for 38 years. Together, they had three children: Jonathan, Andrea, and Jeffrey. Zucker lived most of his adult life in Charleston, South Carolina

Ted Levin, president of the Emanu-el synagogue, said at Zucker's funeral:
 "Anybody who reached out to him for help never went away with an empty hand....It's a loss not just for our community, or for Charleston, but it's a loss for the world."

Legacy
Shortly after Zucker's death, the Charleston County School Board decided to name a new North Charleston middle school in his honor. The Jerry Zucker Middle School of Science opened on August 24, 2008, which would have been Zucker's 59th birthday.

The South Carolina Stingrays, of which Zucker was part owner, adorned their helmets with a "JZ" sticker; the practice continues. The team also recognized his contributions to the team and the community by inducting him into the Stingrays Hockey Hall of Fame on March 21, 2009. The Stingrays organization unveiled the Jerry Zucker Community Service award, to be given annually to the Stingrays player who had the greatest impact on the local community. The first to receive the award was Stingrays forward Spencer Carbery. The Jerry Zucker Ride for Hope, started in October 2008, provides fundraising efforts for cancer research at the Hollings Cancer Center at the Medical University of South Carolina.

In June 2009, Zucker's family made a donation of $2 million in Zucker's name to the Medical University of South Carolina. $1 million was allocated for the establishment of the Jerry Zucker Endowed Chair in Brain Tumor Research, an institution intended to support research and investigation into brain tumors.  The remainder was used to support spinal cord research and provide neurological care and medical training in Tanzania.

References

1949 births
2008 deaths
20th-century American businesspeople
American billionaires
American investors
American retail chief executives
American textile industry businesspeople
Businesspeople from Charleston, South Carolina
Deaths from brain cancer in the United States
Governors of the Hudson's Bay Company
Hudson's Bay Company people
Israeli emigrants to the United States
Israeli investors
University of Florida alumni